Svitlana Zelepukina (born 16 August 1980) is a Ukrainian gymnast. She competed at the 1996 Summer Olympics, where she finished 23rd in the all around.

See also 
 List of Olympic female artistic gymnasts for Ukraine

References

External links
 

1980 births
Living people
Ukrainian female artistic gymnasts
Olympic gymnasts of Ukraine
Gymnasts at the 1996 Summer Olympics
Sportspeople from Kropyvnytskyi